SM UC-42 was a German Type UC II minelaying submarine or U-boat in the German Imperial Navy during World War I. The U-boat was ordered on 20 November 1915 and was launched on 21 September 1916. She was commissioned into the German Imperial Navy on 18 November 1916 as SM UC-42.

Design
A German Type UC II submarine, UC-42 had a displacement of  when at the surface and  while submerged. The submarine was powered by two six-cylinder four-stroke diesel engines each producing  (a total of ), two electric motors producing , and two propeller shafts.

UC-42 was fitted with six  mine tubes, eighteen UC 200 mines, three  torpedo tubes (one on the stern and two on the bow), seven torpedoes, and one  Uk L/30 deck gun. Her complement was twenty-six crew members.

Service
In a career that encompassed six patrols, operating from 1 January 1917, UC-42 succeeded in sinking fourteen vessels totaling 9,877 GRT, and disabling a warship of 1,210 tons displacement.

Fate
UC-42 sailed on her last patrol on 1 September 1917.

On 31 October 1917 Torpedo Boat TB 055 was accompanying minesweepers operating at the entrance to Cork harbour. At 1500 hours an oil track was seen floating on the surface of the water. Following it to its source, TB 055 used its hydrophone to see if the oil was coming from a submarine. Loud mechanical sounds, of "hammering" and "turbine-like noises" were reported and, believing this to be a U-boat, a marker buoy was dropped, followed shortly after by a depth charge. Following detonation of the charge, TB 055 returned to the area and found that the volume of floating oil had increased, and there were bubbles rising to the surface.

TB 055 signalled the nearby armed minesweeper HMT Sarba for assistance. Sarba used her hydrophone but detected no sounds from the presumed submarine. A second depth charge was dropped and Sarba remained on station overnight. The following morning HMD Sunshine and TB 058 swept around the spot, to confirm that the incident had not been a false alarm caused by old wreckage. On 2 November oil was still coming to the surface and dockyard divers arrived to inspect the assumed wreck. The divers reported a German U-boat lying on the seabed with her stern blown off, and a brass plate on her conning tower reading "C42, 1916" identified her as UC-42. No survivors were ever reported even though some of the hatches were found to have been opened. It was thought likely that the submarine had been sunk by one of her own mines detonating under her stern while minelaying.

When the sinking and identification of the submarine was reported, the British Admiralty requested an identifiable item from the vessel for verification purposes, and in December 1917 divers recovered the telephone buoy from the conning tower. The Royal Navy's Naval Intelligence Department were aware of submarine's 1 September departure date from Belgium and were sceptical about the hammering and engine noises reported by TB 055. The Admiralty reported that "The longest known cruise of a UC boat in home waters is 24 days, so UC-42 must have been dead long before TB 055 and Sarba dropped the depth charges".

Rediscovery 
The wreck was relocated on 6 November 2010 by Irish divers Ian Kelleher, Niall O'Regan, Philip Johnston, Eoin McGarry and Timmy Carey   in just  of water off Roche's Point Co. Cork. It was found with "little obvious explosive damage". A serial number stamped on one of the propellers allowed positive identification as the UC-42.

A commemorative plaque was subsequently attached to the boat's stern and under International Maritime Law she is now a War Grave, untouchable and the responsibility of the Deutsche Marine.

Summary of raiding history

References

Notes

Citations

Bibliography

External links
 wrecksite.eu
 Cork divers discover WWI U-boat RTÉ news report of find, January 2011.
 

Ships built in Hamburg
German Type UC II submarines
U-boats commissioned in 1916
U-boats sunk by mines
Maritime incidents in 1917
U-boats sunk in 1917
World War I minelayers of Germany
World War I shipwrecks in the Celtic Sea
World War I submarines of Germany
1916 ships
Ships lost with all hands